Sereno Watson (December 1, 1826 in East Windsor Hill, Connecticut – March 9, 1892 in Cambridge, Massachusetts) was an American botanist.
Graduating from Yale in 1847 in Biology, he drifted through various occupations until, in California, he joined the Clarence King Expedition and eventually became its expedition botanist.  Appointed by Asa Gray as assistant in the Gray Herbarium of Harvard University in 1873, he later became its curator, a position he maintained until his death. Watson was elected a Fellow of the American Academy of Arts and Sciences in 1874, and a member of the National Academy of Sciences in 1889.

Works
 Botany, in Report of the geological exploration of the 40th parallel made ... by Clarence King, 1871
 
 Publications by and about S. Watson on WorldCat

References

External links
Biographical sketch at the Gray Herbarium site
Biographical memoir, National Academy of Sciences 
Obituary, page 441
Portrait (plate VI) and obituary by John Merle Coulter (137–141)

American taxonomists
1826 births
1892 deaths
 
Botanists active in California
Botanists active in North America
Fellows of the American Academy of Arts and Sciences
Harvard University staff
Members of the United States National Academy of Sciences
People from South Windsor, Connecticut
Yale University alumni
19th-century American botanists